The Presidential Leadership Council (PLC) is the executive body of Yemen's internationally-recognized government, formed in Riyadh, Saudi Arabia, by a presidential decree on 7 April 2022, to seek a "comprehensive political solution" to the Yemeni civil war. It is headed by Rashad Muhammad Al-Alimi and has a membership of eight members. All the powers of the president and vice president have been transferred to this council. The chairman is vested with sweeping powers, including the ability to unilaterally command the military and appoint governors and other key officials.

Members 
Rashad al-Alimi (chairman), a former adviser to President Abdrabbuh Mansur Hadi.
Tareq Saleh (member), a Yemeni military commander and the nephew of the late President Ali Abdullah Saleh. He is the leader of the National Resistance.
Sultan Ali al-Arada (member), considered one of the most prominent tribal and military figures and is also governor of Marib Governorate. He is a member of the Al-Islah party.
Abed al-Rahman Abu Zara’a (member), known among Yemenis as Abu Zara'a Al Muharrami, he also leads the UAE-backed Southern Movement's Giants Brigades. He is known to be a Salafist.
Abdullah al-Alimi Bawazeer (member), was considered one of President Hadi’s inner circle. He also is a member of the Al-Islah party.
Othman Hussein Megali (member), a lawmaker and one of the tribal leaders in Sa'dah, the main stronghold of the Houthis.
Aidarus al-Zoubaidi (member), the current president and commander of the Southern Transitional Council and the de facto leader of the Southern Movement in Yemen.
Faraj Salmin al-Buhsani (member),the former governor of Hadramaut and former commander of the second military region that operates in the province.

See also 

 Consultation and Reconciliation Commission

References

Politics of Yemen
Yemeni Crisis (2011–present)
Cabinets established in 2022
Presidential Leadership Council
2022 establishments in Yemen
2022 in Yemen